Jennifer Tait (born 4 January 1995) is an Australian female volleyball player.

She was named in the Australian Volleyroos Women's Squad and has participated in the 2017 FIVB Volleyball World Grand Prix, and 2018 FIVB Volleyball Women's Challenger Cup.

She played for Campbell University.

References 

1995 births
Living people
Australian women's volleyball players